Integrin-linked kinase-associated serine/threonine phosphatase 2C is an enzyme that in humans is encoded by the ILKAP gene.

The protein encoded by this gene is a protein serine/threonine phosphatase of the PP2C family. This protein can interact with integrin-linked kinase (ILK/ILK1), a regulator of integrin mediated signaling, and regulate the kinase activity of ILK. Through the interaction with ILK, this protein may selectively affect the signaling process of ILK-mediated glycogen synthase kinase 3 beta (GSK3beta), and thus participate in Wnt signaling pathway.

Interactions 

ILKAP has been shown to interact with Integrin-linked kinase.

References

Further reading